ANCIIENTS are a Canadian heavy metal band from Vancouver, British Columbia. The band was founded by vocalist and guitarist Kenny Cook, guitarists Brock MacInnes and Chris Dyck, bassist Aaron "Boon" Gustafson and drummer Mike Hannay.

The band was formed in 2011 following the demise of Spread Eagle (not the New York hard rock band of the same name), a band which included Cook, Gustafson and Dyck.

The band released their debut album, Heart of Oak, in 2013 on Season of Mist. The album was named a long-listed nominee for the 2013 Polaris Music Prize.

In spring 2013, the band toured part of the United States as an opening act for Lamb of God. In fall 2013, the band were slated to tour both Canada and the United States as an opening act for selected dates on Sepultura's "Tsunami of Metal" tour, although the tour was cancelled due to Sepultura's difficulties in obtaining travel visas to enter the United States.

In 2014, Brock MacInnes left Anciients to join the band Dead Quiet. Dyck left the band in January 2017, but the band had recorded their second album Voice of the Void, which was released in October of 2017. The album won the Juno Award for Metal/Hard Music Album of the Year at the Juno Awards of 2018.

Discography

Studio albums
 Heart of Oak (2013)
 Voice of the Void (2016)
EPs
 Snakebeard (2011)

References

External links
ANCIIENTS on CBC Music

Canadian heavy metal musical groups
Musical groups from Vancouver
Musical quartets
Musical groups established in 2011
2011 establishments in British Columbia
Season of Mist artists
Juno Award for Heavy Metal Album of the Year winners